The following lists events that happened during 2015 in Somalia.

Incumbents
 President: Hassan Sheikh Mohamud
 Prime Minister: Omar Abdirashid Ali Sharmarke

Events

January
 January 27 - Prime Minister Omar Abdirashid Ali Sharmarke appoints a new, smaller 20 minister Cabinet.

See also
2015 timeline of the War in Somalia

References

 
Somalia
2010s in Somalia
Years of the 21st century in Somalia
Somalia